Never Shout Never is an EP by Never Shout Never which was released on December 8, 2009. The physical release is sold exclusively at Hot Topic. The EP features two songs from his then upcoming Sire Records full-length debut, What is Love?, one song that is a B-side from The Summer EP and one live track.

Track listing

References

2009 EPs
Never Shout Never albums
Sire Records EPs
Warner Records EPs
Albums produced by Butch Walker